Maurice Marie Émile Leblanc (11 December 1864 – 6 November 1941) was a French novelist and writer of short stories, known primarily as the creator of the fictional gentleman thief and detective Arsène Lupin, often described as a French counterpart to Arthur Conan Doyle's creation Sherlock Holmes.

The first Arsène Lupin story appeared in a series of short stories that was serialized in the magazine Je sais tout, starting in No. 6, dated 15 July 1905. Clearly created at editorial request, it is possible that Leblanc had also read Octave Mirbeau's Les 21 jours d'un neurasthénique (1901), which features a gentleman thief named Arthur Lebeau, and he had seen Mirbeau's comedy Scrupules (1902), whose main character is a gentleman thief.

By 1907, Leblanc had graduated to writing full-length Lupin novels, and the reviews and sales were so good that Leblanc effectively dedicated the rest of his career to working on the Lupin stories. Like Conan Doyle, who often appeared embarrassed or hindered by the success of Sherlock Holmes and seemed to regard his success in the field of crime fiction as a detraction from his more "respectable" literary ambitions, Leblanc also appeared to have resented Lupin's success. Several times he tried to create other characters, such as private eye Jim Barnett, but he eventually merged them with Lupin. He continued to pen Lupin tales well into the 1930s.

Leblanc also wrote two notable science fiction novels:  (1919), in which a scientist makes televisual contact with three-eyed Venusians, and Le Formidable Evènement (1920), in which an earthquake creates a new landmass between England and France.

Leblanc was awarded the Légion d'Honneur for his services to literature, and died in Perpignan in 1941. He was buried in the Montparnasse Cemetery. Georgette Leblanc was his sister.

Life 
Maurice Leblanc was the second child of Émile Leblanc, 34-year-old ship-owner merchant, and of Mathilde Blanche (née Brohy) daughter of rich dyers, aged 21 and was delivered by Achille Flaubert, Gustave Flaubert's brother. He had an elder sister Jehanne (born in 1863) and a younger sister Georgette Leblanc (born in 1869) who would be the interpreter of Maurice Maeterlinck, Georgettte Leblanc's companion from 1895 to 1918.

During the Franco-German War of 1870, his father sent Maurice to Scotland. Upon his return to France, he completed his studies in Rouen. The young Maurice received his first education in a free institution, the Patry pension. Then, from 1875 to 1882, completed his secondary studies at the Lycée Corneille. As a teenager, he frequently encountered Gustave Flaubert and Guy de Maupassant.

Refusing the career that his father intended for him at a card factory, Maurice instead headed to Paris in 1888, to pursue writing. First a journalist, then novelist and storyteller. His first novel, "Une femme" (A Woman), published in 1893 was very successful, and was followed by other works, such as "Des couples" (The Couples),  "Voici des ailes" (Here are wings) and his only play, "La pitié", released in 1902, which is a failure, causing him to give up the theater for a while. In 1901, he published "L'Enthousiasme", an autobiographical novel.

In 1905, Pierre Lafitte, the director of the monthly Je sais tout, commissioned a short story from Leblanc, that was to be in the vein of A.J Raffles by Ernest William Hornung and the adventures of Sherlock Holmes. The resulting "L'Arrestation d’Arsène Lupin" (The Arrest of Arsène Lupin) proved to be a great public success. Two years later, the book Arsène Lupin, Gentleman Burglar was released, containing the first nine stories depicting the character that were published in the French magazine 'Je sais tout'.
The following book Arsène Lupin versus Herlock Sholmes, a second collection of Arsène Lupin stories written by Maurice Leblanc, angered the Sherlock Holmes creator Conan Doyle, who saw Leblanc's Herlock Sholmes and Wilson as parody characters designed to ridicule Doyle's work.

Maurice Leblanc received the Legion of Honor on January 17, 1908, presented by then Under-Secretary of State for Fine Arts, Étienne Dujardin-Beaumetz. While a supporter of French radical socialists and free-thinker in his early age, Leblanc became more bourgeois around the time of the First World War. Leblanc would start to grow weary of writing Arsène Lupin stories. As early as 1910, he tried to kill his hero in the story "813", but would resuscitate the character in the story The Crystal Stopper.

In 1918, Maurice Leblanc bought a half-timbered Anglo-Norman house in Étretat (which he would name Clos Lupin), where he wrote 19 novels and 39 short stories. Faced with the imminent war with Nazi Germany, he left Clos Lupin in 1939 and took refuge in Perpignan, where he died of pneumonia in 1941. Disinterred from the Saint-Martin cemetery in Perpignan in 1947, he was reburied on October 14 of the same year at the Montparnasse cemetery in Paris, alongside his wife Marguerite and other members of his family (notably his step-brother René Renoult).

Private life 
At the end of 1888, Maurice Leblanc decided to leave Rouen for Paris where he married, on January 10, 1889, Marie-Ernestine Flannel (1865-1941). They divorced in 1895. By Marie-Ernestine Flannel he fathered Louise Amélie Marie Leblanc (1889-1974). Maurice later fell in love with Marguerite Wormser (1865-1950) who already had a son Claude Oulmann (1902-1994), who was subsequently authorized by decree to bear the name of Leblanc. Maurice had health problems and sank into a depression, which was compounded by Marguerite's divorce from her first husband taking time to go through the courts. Leblanc and Wormser did not marry until January 31, 1906.

Legacy 

The "Association des Amis d’Arsène Lupin" (Association of Friends of Arsène Lupin) was founded in 1985 by the philosopher François George. Its members are sometimes known as "lupinophiles".

Leblanc's work inspired Gaston Leroux (creator of Rouletabille), as well as Souvestre and Allain (creators of Fantômas).

Arsène Lupin's exploits took place in the capital and in Pays de Caux, which Maurice Leblanc knew well. Being a collector of postcards, he had listed no less than four hundred manors between Le Havre, Rouen and Dieppe. The "lupinophiles" roam the places mentioned in the intrigues of Leblanc in Normandy: Étretat and the treasure of the kings of France, Tancarville, the underground passage of Jumièges leading to the medieval treasure of the abbeys, etc.

In popular culture 

The character Arsène Lupin III, protagonist of the Japanese manga Lupin III beginning in 1967, was written as the grandson of Arsène Lupin but without permission from Leblanc's estate. This was later the source of a lawsuit though the copyright on Leblanc's work has since expired. When the anime version was broadcast in France, the character was renamed Edgar, le détective cambrioleur ("Edgar, the Burglar Detective"). The authors of the various Lupin III properties drew on Leblanc's novels as inspiration; notably, the film The Castle of Cagliostro was loosely based on La Comtesse de Cagliostro (The Countess of Cagliostro).

He is also referenced in Persona 5 where the main character's persona is the character Arsène. The main character is staying at Cafe Leblanc after being expelled from his former school for defending a woman.

Most recently, the main character of the Netflix series Lupin, released in January 2021, used Lupin as an inspiration for his own grand theft. Inspired by one of the Lupin books, he tries to avenge his father's wrongful accusation of stealing a necklace years earlier. He decides to steal the same necklace from the Louvre by mimicking the style of Arsène Lupin. Parts of the final episode of Part One were filmed in the town of Étretat. This location is significant because Maurice Leblanc lived in the commune. Some of the works were written at his residence there. The building is now the Clos Lupin Museum.

Selected bibliography 

  (1893)
  (1897)
  (1898)
  (1899)
  (1901)
  (1901)
  (1904)
  (1904)
 , Play (1906)
Arsène Lupin contre Herlock Sholmès (1908)
  ("The Hollow Needle") (1909)
  (1910)
  ("The Frontier")(1911)
  ("The Three Eyes") (1919)
  (1920)
  ("The Tremendous Event") (1920)
  (1922)
  (US: "The Secret Tomb", UK: "Dorothy the Rope Dancer") (1922)
  (1924)
  (1925)
  ("Man of Mystery") (1930)
  (1932)
  (1933)
  (1934)
  ("Wanton Venus") (1934)
  (1935)
  ("From Midnight to Morning") (1937)

See also
 Marius Jacob

Notes

References

Bibliography
 .
 .
 .
 
 .

External links 

 
 
 
 
 
 Le Clos Arsène Lupin, Maison Maurice Leblanc (museum)
 Arsène Lupin site

1864 births
1941 deaths
Writers from Rouen
Arsène Lupin
French science fiction writers
French crime fiction writers
19th-century French writers
20th-century French novelists
Lycée Pierre-Corneille alumni
Recipients of the Legion of Honour
Burials at Montparnasse Cemetery
French male novelists